The Carlyle Restaurant, formerly Dumonet at the Carlyle, is a Contemporary American  cuisine restaurant located at 35 East 76th Street (at Madison Ave), in the back of the Carlyle Hotel, on the Upper East Side in Manhattan, in New York City.  It was established in 1930.

Menu
The Contemporary American cuisine is fresh and seasonal, and includes local items such as New Jersey scallops and Dover sole.
The Executive Chef is Mark Richardson.

Restaurant
The elegant, gracious, plush restaurant is decorated in the style of an English manor house.  It seats 90 diners, and has dark mahogany decor lightened by large floral arrangements.  Zagats described the restaurant as "Dorothy Draper"–esque.  Jackets are required for dinner.

Reviews
In 2013, Zagats gave it a food rating of 24, with a decor rating that was the second-highest on the Upper East Side, at 27.

In 2000, Forbes gave it four stars.  In a 2002 review in The New York Times, entitled "A Frump Does Something About It", William Grimes gave it one star and wrote that: "The Carlyle Restaurant used to feel like one big frayed cuff. Now it takes its rightful place alongside the dining rooms in Manhattan's finest hotels."  The following year he gave it two stars.

References

External links
www.rosewoodhotels.com

Restaurants in Manhattan
Restaurants established in 1930
Upper East Side